Grenades Football Club is an Antiguan football established in 1990 and playing in the Antigua and Barbuda Premier Division. The club is based in St. John's, Antigua. Grenades joined the Premier Division in 2013–14, finishing fourth in their first season.

References

Football clubs in Antigua and Barbuda